Por Favor may refer to:

Por Favor (album), by Brett Dennen, 2016
"Por Favor" (song), by Pitbull and Fifth Harmony, 2017
"Por Favor", a song by Cetu Javu, a B-side of the single "Help Me Now!", 1987